A buoy tender is a type of vessel used to maintain and replace navigational buoys. This term can also apply to an actual person who does this work.

The United States Coast Guard uses buoy tenders to accomplish one of its primary missions of maintaining all U.S. aids to navigation (ATON).

The Canadian Coast Guard uses multi-use vessels (most being icebreakers) with tasks including buoy tending.

Types of coast guard buoy tenders

United States Coast Guard
240' 
225' USCG seagoing buoy tender (WLB)
175' USCG coastal buoy tender (WLM)
100' USCG inland buoy tender (WLI) 
100' USCG inland construction tender (WLIC)
 75' River buoy tender (WLR)
 75' Inland construction tender (WLIC)
 65' River buoy tender (WLR)
 65' Inland buoy tender (WLI)
 49' Buoy utility stern loading boat (BUSL)
 Other miscellaneous aids to navigation boats

Canadian Coast Guard
272' 
272' 
228' 
228' 
198' 
180' 
179' 
180' 
144' 
125' 
66'

Further reading
 United States Coast Guard Bibliography and links on buoy tenders.

References

Boat types

Ships of the United States Lighthouse Service